Military service in the Cypriot National Guard is mandatory for all male citizens of the Republic of Cyprus, as well as any male non-citizens born of a parent of Greek Cypriot descent, lasting from the January 1 of the year in which they turn 18 years of age to December 31, of the year in which they turn 50.  All male residents of Cyprus who are of military age (16 and over) are required to obtain an exit visa from the Ministry of Defense.

The Republic of Cyprus has an active military draft. Conscripts enlisting as of the 2016 winter draft have to serve a term of 14 months, and military service continues as a reservist after the end of the term. Reservists are called up several times a year, for 1 or 2 days at a time, each year until the age of 50, at which point they can choose to voluntarily continue their military service. The Cyprus Army enlists both Cypriot citizens and those who don’t hold a Cypriot citizenship but have ‘Cypriot origins’ This is not in accordance with international law since only citizenship can be attached to civic duties.

If conscientious objector status is claimed due to religious or ideological reasons, the objector may serve either an alternative military or civil service, depending on the circumstances of each case. Enlisting had been optional for members of the Armenian, Maronite, and Roman Catholic minorities, but as of 2008 service was made compulsory for them as well.

Conscripts will complete three weeks basic training at one of three recruit training centres, located in Paphos, Limassol and Larnaca. After taking an oath of allegiance on the Thursday of their third week of basic training they are granted three days leave. They will then complete a week of individual training with their assigned units followed by two weeks of battle school. This is followed by MOS training that lasts between two and 10 weeks depending upon their specialty.

The Cypriot National Guard has received one of the poorest rankings among European nations in the 2014 LGBTQ Military Index.

See also

 Reduction of military conscription in Cyprus

References

External links
National Guard of Cyprus
Cyprus Ministry of Defence

Military of Cyprus
Law of Cyprus
Society of Cyprus
Cyprus